Ngoma is a small town in Nakaseke District, Central Uganda. It is one of the municipalities within Nakaseke District. Other municipalities in the district include: (a) Butalangu (b) Kapeeka (c) Nakaseke (d)
Semuto and (e) Wakyaato.

Location
The coordinates of the town are:1°10'50.0"N 32°01'03.0"E (Latitude:1.180551; Longitude:32.017491).

Population
During the national census and household survey of August 2014, the Uganda Bureau of Statistics (UBOS), enumerated the population of Ngoma at 6,295 people.

Landmarks
The landmarks within the town limits or near the town include: (a) The offices of Ngoma Town Council (b) Ngoma Health Centre IV (c) Ngoma Central Market and (d) Oliver Tambo School of Leadership - Located at Kaweweta, near Ngoma.

See also
 Kaweweta
 Nakaseke District
 Luweero Triangle
 Central Region, Uganda

References

External links

Nakaseke District
Central Region, Uganda
Populated places in Uganda
Cities in the Great Rift Valley